Carolyn M. Squires (September 25, 1940 – March 21, 2016) was an American nurse and politician.

Background
Born in Whitefish, Montana, Squires grew up in Everett, Washington and went to Catholic schools. Squires received her associate degree in arts and science from Everett Community College. She then returned to Montana and went to the Missoula Vocational Technical Center and received her LPN license in 1967. Squires served as a nurse in hospitals in Missoula, Montana. Squires was involved with the AFL–CIO helping displaced union members with retraining. Squires died at her home in Missoula, Montana.

Political career
Squires served as a Democrat member of the Montana House of Representatives for the 96th district from 2010 to 2015. From 2002 to 2010, she was a member of the Montana Senate, representing District 48, where she served as Majority Whip. Earlier she was a member of the Montana House of Representatives from 1987 through 2000.

References

External links
Project Vote Smart - Senator Carolyn M. Squires (MT) profile

1940 births
2016 deaths
American nurses
American women nurses
Everett Community College alumni
Democratic Party members of the Montana House of Representatives
Democratic Party Montana state senators
People from Whitefish, Montana
Politicians from Everett, Washington
Politicians from Missoula, Montana
University of Montana alumni
Women state legislators in Montana
21st-century American women